or  is a mountain range on the island of Alsten in Alstahaug Municipality in Nordland county, Norway.

The mountain range consists of seven peaks on the southeastern half of the island.  The mountains are (listed from northeast to southwest): 
 Botnkrona, with a height of 
 Grytfoten, with a height of 
 Skjæringen, with a height of 
 Kvasstinden, with a height of 
 Breitinden, with a height of 

The range is popular with hikers and offers scenic views over the surrounding area.

All the peaks can be ascended using marked paths, and on every summit there is a notebook where visitors can write their name. After visiting all peaks, hikers can contact the local tourist association which will issue a certificate as a testimonial of their achievement. There is no time-limit for climbing all the peaks. The record for the quickest visit to all peaks is under 4 hours.

A good view of the mountain range can be achieved traveling by sea in the "Hurtigruten", as it passes the full length of the range.

See also 

 Kjerag
 Kjeragbolten
 Preikestolen
 Trollgaren
 Trollveggen
 Trollstigen
 Trolltunga
 Besseggen
 List of waterfalls

References 

Syv sostre
Syv sostre
Syv sostre
Tourist attractions in Nordland